Accessory abducens nucleus is a small cluster of neurons in the pontine reticular formation of the rat and rabbit.

In the rabbit, motoneurons that are involved in the nictitating membrane response are found in the accessory abducens nucleus.

Crosby et al. (1962) questioned whether, in the human, it exists independently of the accessory facial nucleus.

References

External links 
 More information at BrainInfo 

Animal nervous system